Þóra Magnúsdóttir (born c. 1100;;;) was a daughter of King Magnus III of Norway (Magnus 3 Olavsson Berrføtt).

Þóra married an Icelandic man and moved to Iceland. Her husband, Loftur Sæmundsson was a chieftain of Oddi at Rangárvellir in the south part of Iceland. He was  a member of the Oddaverjar clan and son of Icelandic priest and scholar Sæmundur fróði Sigfússon. Their son Jón Loftsson was later chieftain at Oddi.  

Descendants of Loftur and Þóra included Þuríður Sturludóttir (born c. 1228), who married  Hrafn Oddsson (born c. 1225), a descendant of Skallagrímur Kveldúlfsson (Skalla-Grímr), the father of skald  Egill Skallagrímsson. With the birth of Jón korpur Hrafnsson, the feuding clans of the Fairhair  and Skalla-Grímr dynasties were united.

References

Other sources
 Islendingabók  (Book of Icelanders)
 Konungasögur (Kings' sagas) 
 Egils saga Skallagrímssonar (Egil's saga)

1100s births
12th-century deaths
12th-century Icelandic people
12th-century Norwegian nobility
Icelandic people of Norwegian descent
12th-century Icelandic women
12th-century Norwegian women
Daughters of kings